Kosmos 2499 was a Russian satellite orbiting the Earth, before breaking up on January 4, 2023.

Mission
The satellite was launched on May 23, 2014, from Plesetsk, Russia on a Rokot/Briz-KM launch vehicle along with 3 Rodnik-S satellites. Following launch the spacecraft was provisionally described by the NASA Orbital Debris Program Office as Object E until its identity was confirmed. USSPACECOM tracked it under satellite catalog number 39765.

Some reports have speculated, based on its unusual powered maneuvers, that it may be an experimental anti-satellite weapon, satellite maintenance vehicle, or collector of space debris. Chatham House research director and space security expert Patricia Lewis stated that "whatever it is, [Object 2014-028E] looks experimental."

According to an article published on the official Moscow Institute of Physics and Technology website, congratulating the developers on the successful launch and deployment, the satellite is designed to test experimental plasma propulsion engines/ion thrusters, designed by the JSC Reshetnev Company and the Keldysh Research Center. The article states that the engines are part of a new generation of Hall effect thrusters and are designed to be able to shift a spacecraft on an east-west and north-south axis using a fraction of the energy required by current propulsion systems.

Post-mission
In December 2021 USSPACECOM catalogued 18 debris associated with Kosmos 2499.

On February 6, 2023, US Space Command confirmed that the breakup of Kosmos 2499 had occurred on January 4, 2023, at 03:57 UTC. They catalogued 85 associated pieces, orbiting at  altitude.

See also

 2014 in spaceflight
 Cold War II
 Istrebitel Sputnikov
 X-37B

References

External links
 

Kosmos satellites
Spacecraft launched in 2014
2014 in Russia
Spacecraft that broke apart in space